Hisonotus leucophrys is a species of catfish in the family Loricariidae. It is native to South America, where it is known only from the Ariranha River and the Rancho Grande River, two tributaries of the Uruguay River in Brazil. The species may be found in moderate to fast-flowing waters with stony or sandy substrates and submerged vegetation. It reaches 4.2 cm (1.7 inches) SL.

References 

Endemic fauna of Brazil
Otothyrinae